Şenköy is a village in the Midyat District of Mardin Province in Turkey. The village is populated by Kurds of the Habezbenî tribe and by the Mhallami. It had a population of 2,349 in 2021.

References 

Villages in Midyat District
Mhallami villages
Kurdish settlements in Mardin Province